Harauti or Hadauti (Hadoti) is a Rajasthani language spoken by approximately four million people in the Hadoti region of southeastern Rajasthan, India. Its speakers are concentrated in the districts of Kota, Baran, Bundi and Jhalawar in Rajasthan, as well as in neighbouring areas of Madhya Pradesh.

It has a nominative marker /nɛ/, which is absent in other Rajasthani languages.

Its word order is the typical subject–object–verb. Its characteristic feature, unlike Hindi, is the presence or absence of agentive marker in the perfect depending on the nature of the accusative marker.

Some sample translations

See also 

Rajasthani 
Malvi
Mewari

References

Further reading 

Hindi languages
Languages of India
Languages of Rajasthan